Bogusław Cygan (3 November 1964 – 15 January 2018) was a Polish football striker who played for Górnik Zabrze, Stal Mielec and Lausanne Sports in Switzerland. Cygan was the Ekstraklasa top scorer in the 1994-95 season. After he retired, he became a coach.

References

1964 births
2018 deaths
Polish footballers
Polish expatriate footballers
Stal Mielec players
Górnik Zabrze players
Polonia Bytom players
Śląsk Wrocław players
FC Lausanne-Sport players
Ekstraklasa players
Expatriate footballers in Switzerland
Sportspeople from Ruda Śląska
Association football forwards